KAZQ (channel 32) is a non-commercial religious independent television station in Albuquerque, New Mexico, United States. Its transmitter is located on Sandia Crest northeast of Albuquerque. Owned by Alpha Omega Broadcasting, KAZQ is sister to low-power station KTVS-LD (channel 36) and the two stations share studios on Montgomery Boulevard Northeast in Albuquerque.

History 
The station was issued an original construction permit on June 30, 1986, began operation on October 12, 1987, and was licensed by the FCC on March 29, 1988. Initially, it aired only Christian programming, but later added family-friendly secular programs to its schedule. KAZQ has been under the same ownership since the station was founded and is one of three full-service Christian television stations in the market — the others are KNAT-TV (channel 23) and KCHF (channel 11).

Programming 
The station broadcasts on an educational license and cannot air any advertising or infomercials, although it airs several hours a day of family entertainment. Some of the programs on KAZQ include Life Today with James Robison, This Is Your Day with Benny Hinn, The 700 Club and The New Jim Bakker Show.

Alpha Omega Broadcasting also owns low power station KTVS-LD, UHF channel 36, which has a similar format, but originally featured more secular programming. KTVS-LD currently relays KAZQ on digital channel 36.1 with Almavision on 36.2.

Technical information

Subchannels 
The station's digital signal is multiplexed:

Analog-to-digital conversion
In 1997, the FCC allotted UHF channel 17 for KAZQ's digital television station. KAZQ applied for a construction permit in May 2000; it was granted February 12, 2001, allowing the station to begin building its digital facilities.  Special Temporary Authorization granted in March 2003 allowed KAZQ-DT to go on the air at reduced power while continuing to build full-power facilities.  The station obtained its DTV license on January 6, 2006.  KAZQ has elected to remain on channel 17 after the end of the DTV transition on June 12, 2009. Through the use of PSIP, digital television receivers display the station's virtual channel as its former UHF analog channel 32.

References

External links 
Official website

Television channels and stations established in 1987
1987 establishments in New Mexico
Religious television stations in the United States
AZQ
Mass media in Albuquerque, New Mexico